Antelothanasis was a Greek shooter.  He competed at the 1896 Summer Olympics in Athens. Antelothanasis competed in the free rifle event.  His place and score in the event are not known, though he did not finish in the top five.

References

External links 
 

Year of birth missing
Year of death missing
Greek male sport shooters
Olympic shooters of Greece
Shooters at the 1896 Summer Olympics
19th-century sportsmen
Place of birth missing
Place of death missing